The 33rd News & Documentary Emmy Awards were held on October 1, 2012, at Rose Hall, Home of Jazz at Lincoln Center, located in the Time Warner Center in New York City. Awards were presented in 42 categories, including Breaking News, Investigative Reporting, Outstanding Interview, and Best Documentary. In attendance were over 900 television and news media industry executives, news and documentary producers and journalists.

Notable awards included the Lifetime Achievement Award given to news anchors Jorge Ramos and María Elena Salinas of Noticiero Univision.

Winners

Network breakdown
The following chart is a breakdown of number of awards won this awards season per station.

Breakdown by program

Awards

Nominees
 By station

Presenters
 George Stephanopoulos, anchor, Good Morning America and This Week
 Jeff Fager, chairman, CBS News and Executive Producer, 60 Minutes
 Bill Moyers, host, Moyers & Company
 Lara Logan, correspondent, CBS News and  60 Minutes, co-host Person to Person
 Fareed Zakaria, host, Fareed Zakaria GPS and Editor at Large, Time
 David Pogue, technical columnist, The New York Times and host, Nova ScienceNow
 Tamron Hall, anchor, MSNBC's NewsNation, frequent co-host, Today
 Marvin Scott, senior correspondent, WPIX, anchor/host of PIX News Close Up
 N. J. Burkett, correspondent, WABC-TV
 Bruce Paisner, President & CEO, International Academy of Television Arts and Sciences

References

External links
 Official Site
 List of Nominees

33
2012 in New York City
2012 television awards
October 2012 events in the United States